Joanne Kylie Fox  (born 12 June 1979 in Melbourne, Victoria) is an Australian water polo player from the gold medal squad of the 2000 Summer Olympics. Fox also played on the 2004 Summer Olympics squad in Athens, Greece.

See also
 Australia women's Olympic water polo team records and statistics
 List of Olympic champions in women's water polo
 List of Olympic medalists in water polo (women)

References

External links
 

1979 births
Living people
Australian female water polo players
Olympic gold medalists for Australia in water polo
Water polo players at the 2000 Summer Olympics
Water polo players at the 2004 Summer Olympics
Sportswomen from Victoria (Australia)
Sportspeople from Melbourne
Medalists at the 2000 Summer Olympics
Recipients of the Medal of the Order of Australia
21st-century Australian women
20th-century Australian women